Rapid River may refer to the following streams in the U.S. state of Michigan:

 Rapid River (Delta County, Michigan)
 Rapid River (Kalkaska County, Michigan)
 Rapid River (Ontonagon County, Michigan)

See also 
 Rapid River, Michigan, a community in Delta County
 Rapid River Township, Michigan, Kalkaska County
 Rapid River (disambiguation)

Rivers of Michigan
Set index articles on rivers of Michigan